An Australian play written by playwright, Beatrix Christian, which tells the story of Evelyn Carr. who leaves her home town to come to Blackrock to work for Blue, a children's writer. Acting as mentor, Blue leads Evelyn on a journey of self-discovery that is magical, sensuous and frightening (5 acts, 2 men, 4 women). Blue Murder is a complex study of the way men have created the fantasy that their art is more important than reality - even more real than death.

It has been published by Currency Press since 1994.

First Production

Blue Murder was first performed by Company B at the Belvoir Street Theatre, Sydney on 5 April 1994 with the following cast:

Lucy Bell: EVE

Kelly Butler: ANGEL

Rebecca Frith: LEURA

Sacha Horler: ROSE

Jamie Jackson: LYLE & ROY

Jacek Koman: BLUE

Directed by Antoinette Blaxland

Designed by Dan Potra

Lighting by Rory Dempster

Sound Design by Paul Healy

External links
Blue Murder Promotional Kit Designed by Daniel Stone in 2005 for a Sydney Production of the play. Site Contains synopsis, Brief Analysis, Press Releases and Posters, Flyers, Programs.

References

Australian plays
1994 plays